The Ville is a historic African-American neighborhood located in North St. Louis, Missouri. It has had a long history of African-American businesses and residents.

This neighborhood is bounded by St. Louis Avenue on the north, Martin Luther King Drive on the south, Sarah on the east and Taylor on the west.

Prior to the United States Civil Rights Movement, the use of restrictive covenants and other legal restrictions prevented African Americans from finding housing in many areas of the city.  As a result, the African-American population of St. Louis was concentrated in and around the Ville.  The neighborhood was the site of a number of important cultural institutions for the Black community, including Sumner High School, the first high school for Black students west of the Mississippi River; and Homer G. Phillips Hospital, established in 1937 as one of the few Black teaching hospitals in the United States and the only one in the city to serve Black people.

As of the 2010 Census, there are 1,868 people living in The Ville and 6,189 people in the surrounding Greater Ville neighborhood.

Education
 Cote Brilliante Elementary School (closed)
 De La Salle Middle School at St. Matthew's 
 Annie Malone's Emerson Therapeutic Academy (located in De La Salle Middle)
 Marshall School
 Simmons Elementary School
 Sumner High School
 Turner Middle School
 Williams Middle Community Education Center

Notable natives
 Arthur Ashe
 Josephine Baker
 Chuck Berry
 Grace Bumbry
 John Collins-Muhammad
 Julia Davis
 Herman Dreer
 Dick Gregory
 Sonny Liston
 Vincent Price
 Maxine Waters

Demographics
In 2020 The Ville's racial makeup was 95.9% Black, 1.7% White, 0.3% American Indian, 1.8% Two or More Races, and 0.4% Some Other Race. 0.3% of the people were of Hispanic or Latino origin.

See also
 Peabody–Darst–Webbe, St. Louis neighborhood of another city hospital

References

Neighborhoods in St. Louis
History of racial segregation in the United States